The 1947–48 Serie A season was the 15th season of the Serie A, the top level of ice hockey in Italy. 11 teams participated in the league, and Hockey Club Milano won the championship.

First round

Group A

Group B

Group C

Qualification round

Playoffs

Semifinals
SG Cortina II - Amatori Milano 8:1

Final
Hockey Club Milano - SG Cortina II (F)

External links
 Season on hockeytime.net

1947–48 in Italian ice hockey
Serie A (ice hockey) seasons
Italy